Michael Bachelard (born 1968) is an Australian journalist and author.

In 1997, Bachelard wrote The Great Land Grab: What every Australian should know about Wik, Mabo and the Ten Point Plan.

Bachelard's Behind the Exclusive Brethren was published in 2008, which explored the Australian sect of the Exclusive Brethren.

For his work as the foreign editor at Fairfax Media, Bachelard was the co-recipient of the 2017 Gold Walkley. Shared with photographer Kate Geraghty, the award was in recognition for their work Surviving IS: Stories from Mosul.

References 

21st-century Australian journalists
1968 births
Living people